Philip Neville French OBE (28 August 1933 – 27 October 2015) was an English film critic and radio producer. French began his career in journalism in the late 1950s, before eventually becoming a BBC Radio producer, and later a film critic. He began writing for The Observer in 1963, and continued to write criticism regularly there until his retirement in 2013.

French was appointed Officer of the Order of the British Empire in December 2012. Upon his death on 27 October 2015, French was referred to by his Observer successor Mark Kermode as "an inspiration to an entire generation of film critics".

Biography
French was born in Liverpool in 1933. The son of an insurance salesman, he was educated at the direct grant Bristol Grammar School and then at Exeter College, Oxford where he read Law. He undertook post-graduate study in Journalism at Indiana University Bloomington, on a scholarship.

French entered journalism as a reporter at the Bristol Evening Post in 1957. He was theatre critic of the New Statesman between 1967 and 1968 and deputy film critic to David Robinson at The Times for some years. French was the film critic of The Observer from 1978, but had begun writing for the paper in 1963. He also wrote for Sight and Sound. French's books include The Movie Moguls: An Informal History of the Hollywood Tycoons (1969) and Westerns, which reappeared in a revised version in 2005. He also wrote the book Cult Movies (1999) together with Karl French, one of his sons.

Between 1959 and 1990, when he took early retirement, French was a BBC Radio producer. At first he was a producer on the North American service, but the bulk of his BBC career was for domestic radio. He was a BBC talks producer (1961–67) and then a senior producer for the corporation from 1968. In the 1960s he produced The Critics on the BBC Home Service and from 1974 to 1990 he produced its successor programme Critics' Forum on BBC Radio 3. His appointment as film critic of The Observer was opposed by the then Controller of Radio 3, Stephen Hearst, who felt that it would be impossible for French to be an impartial producer while also working as a regular film critic, but he was over-ruled by his superior, Howard Newby.

French was named the British Press Awards Critic of the Year in 2009. He was appointed Officer of the Order of the British Empire (OBE) in the 2013 New Year Honours for services to film. French was known for his exceptional memory. Michael Billington, The Guardians theatre critic, was appointed an OBE at the same time as French. Billington recalled: "I ended a congratulatory telephone call with the jokey line, 'See you at the palace.' Quick as a flash, he replied, 'As Dirk Bogarde said to Bill Kerr in Appointment in London in 1953'."

At the beginning of May 2013 it was announced that French would retire as film critic for The Observer in August to coincide with his 80th birthday.

French was an Honorary Associate of London Film School.

Style
French had a fondness for puns, which arose from his own experience of having a stammer. In an essay on British cinema and the Post Office he began: "I don't know much about philately, but I know what I lick." He was one of the few who saw and wrote humorously about the lost 1969 Yoko Ono film Self-Portrait that exclusively featured the penis of John Lennon. French was also fond of recalling the B-movie actor who, having exchanged life in Hollywood for a typewriter, called his memoir Forgive Us Our Press Passes.

Personal life
French and his Swedish-born wife Kersti Molin had three sons. Their oldest son, Sean French, is one half of the Nicci French writing team, and another son, Patrick French, is a doctor. His youngest son, Karl, is an editor and author. French had ten grandchildren.

Prompted by the release of the film, The King's Speech, French wrote about his own stammer.

Death

After years of ill health, French died in London of a heart attack on 27 October 2015, aged 82, and his ashes were buried  on the eastern side of Highgate Cemetery.

Speaking after his death, The Observer editor John Mulholland said that French was "a giant figure" in the paper's history and "part of its soul for the past 50 years", adding: He was a brilliant critic whose erudition and judgement were respected by generations of cinema lovers and film-makers alike. He was also a joy to work with, unfailingly warm and generous to colleagues and to the thousands of readers he encountered. He is revered as one of the most astute critics of his generation, whose love of film shone through his lucid and engaging writing. He will be missed sorely, but he will be remembered with affection and respect by his legion of admirers. French's son Sean said, "If readers felt they knew him it's because he put his personality into the writing. He was a very funny man, with a slightly grim comic view of the world and this obsessive thing about puns." The Daily Telegraph said that French was "the doyen of English film critics" and estimated that he had seen some 14,000 films, many of them during the 50 years that he wrote for The Observer.

Works
 1969,  Movie Moguls. An Informal History of the Hollywood Tycoons, Weidenfeld & Nicolson, 
 1974, Westerns: Aspects of a Movie Genre, Viking Press, 
 1980, Three Honest Men: Edmund Wilson, F.R.Leavis, Lionel Trilling – A Critical Mosaic, (ed.) Carcanet Press, 
 1993,   Malle on Malle, (ed.) Faber and Faber
 1995, "Wild Strawberries" (BFI Film Classics) (with Kersti French), BFI Publishing, 
 1999, Cult Movies, (with Karl French), Pavilion Books,  
 2008, Censoring the Moving Image: Manifestos for the Twenty-first Century, (with Julian Petley), University of Chicago Press, 
 2011, I Found it at the Movies: Reflections of a Cinephile, Carcanet Press,

References

External links
 
In Celebration of Philip French, BAFTA webcast, Brighton Festival, 21 April 2008
 Philip French at The Observer
  

1933 births
2015 deaths
20th-century British journalists
20th-century English male writers
20th-century English non-fiction writers
21st-century British journalists
21st-century British non-fiction writers
21st-century English male writers
Alumni of Exeter College, Oxford
BBC radio producers
Burials at Highgate Cemetery
English film critics
Indiana University Bloomington alumni
Journalists from Liverpool
Officers of the Order of the British Empire
People educated at Bristol Grammar School
The Observer people